The 1948 Utah gubernatorial election was held on November 2, 1948. Republican nominee J. Bracken Lee defeated Democratic incumbent Herbert B. Maw with 54.99% of the vote.

General election

Candidates
J. Bracken Lee, Republican 
Herbert B. Maw, Democratic

Results

References

1948
Utah
Gubernatorial